Hanamkonda was a Lok Sabha (parliamentary) constituency in Telangana state (then Andhra Pradesh) in southern India until 2008.
The future Prime Minister, P V Narasimha Rao, won two elections from here.

Vidhan Sabha segments
Hanamkonda Lok Sabha constituency comprised the following Legislative Assembly segments:

Members of Lok Sabha

Election results

1980
 P. V. Narsimha Rao (Indira Congress) : 257,961 votes 
 Janardhan Reddy (Congress-Urs) : 95,012

1984

2004

See also
 Warangal district
 List of Constituencies of the Lok Sabha

References

Hanamkonda district
Former constituencies of the Lok Sabha
2008 disestablishments in India
Constituencies disestablished in 2008
Former Lok Sabha constituencies of Andhra Pradesh